is a public park in the Naganuma-cho region of the city of Hachiōji in Tokyo, Japan.

Overview
The park is located in the Tama Hills, and the Nozaru Pass Hiking Course runs through its southern tip. The park has a wooded area with broad-leaved trees such as sawtooth oak and jolcham oak. Birds found in the park include the Japanese tit, grey wagtail and Daurian redstart.

The park has different elevations with a height difference of 100 meters, and there are steep slopes in it.

Access
 By train: 5 minutes’ walk from Naganuma Station on the Keiō Line.

See also
 Parks and gardens in Tokyo
 National Parks of Japan

References

 Website of Hachioji City (in Japanese)

External links
 Website of Tokyo Metropolitan Park Association (in Japanese)
Parks and gardens in Tokyo